The year 1708 in architecture involved some significant architectural events and new buildings.

Events

October 26 - St Paul's Cathedral in London, designed by Christopher Wren, is topped out

Buildings and structures

Buildings completed
Royal chapel (Église du Dôme) at Les Invalides, Paris, designed by Jules Hardouin Mansart
Bonnington Pavilion, New Lanark, Scotland
Newington Green Unitarian Church, London
Taku Seibyō, Japan
Taschenbergpalais, Dresden, Germany
Tellicherry Fort, Kerala, India
Wilbury House in Wiltshire, designed by William Benson

Births
October 27 – Jean-Rodolphe Perronet, French architect and structural engineer (died 1794)

Deaths
May 11 – Jules Hardouin Mansart, French architect (born 1646)

References

architecture
Years in architecture
18th-century architecture